Classic Country Gents Reunion is an album by the progressive bluegrass band Country Gentlemen, released in 1989. The first classic lineup from the 60' reunites here to record this album.

Track listing

 "Fare Thee Well"
 "Stewball"
 "I'll Be Here In the Morning"
 "Champagne Breakdown"
 "Here Today and Gone Tomorrow" 
 "Gonna Get There Soon"
 "Hey Lala"
  Casey's Last Ride (Kris Kristofferson)
 "Wild Side of Life"
 "Wait a Little Longer" (Hazel Houser)
 "Back Home In Indiana" (Ballard MacDonald, James Hanley)
 "Thinking of You"
 "Say Won't You Be Mine" (Carter Stanley)

Personnel
 Charlie Waller - guitar, vocals
 John Duffey - mandolin, vocals
 Eddie Adcock - banjo, vocals
 Tom Gray - bass, vocals
With
 Mike Auldridge - resonator guitar

References

1989 albums
Sugar Hill Records albums
The Country Gentlemen albums